The Milwaukee Herold was a German language daily newspaper, originally published by William Werner Coleman (1835–1888) in Milwaukee, Wisconsin beginning in 1860. It had a weekly edition for some time, which in 1918 was merged with the weekly edition of Germania to form the new Milwaukee America and became part of the publishing empire of George Brumder.

Notes

Defunct newspapers published in Wisconsin
German-American culture in Milwaukee
Publications established in 1860
Publications disestablished in 1931
History of Milwaukee
German-language newspapers published in Wisconsin
1860 establishments in Wisconsin
1931 disestablishments in Wisconsin